El colmillo de Buda ("The Tooth of Buddha") is a 1949 Mexican film. It was produced by Fernando de Fuentes. It is based on a play by Pedro Muñoz Seca.

External links
 

1949 films
1940s Spanish-language films
Mexican black-and-white films
Films based on works by Pedro Muñoz Seca
Mexican musical comedy films
1949 musical comedy films
1940s Mexican films